Pareiasaurs (meaning "cheek lizards") are an extinct clade of large, herbivorous parareptiles. Members of the group were armoured with scutes which covered large areas of the body. They first appeared in southern Pangea during the Middle Permian, before becoming globally distributed during the Late Permian. Pareiasaurs were the largest reptiles of the Permian, reaching sizes equivalent to those of contemporary therapsids. Pareiasaurs became extinct at the end of the Permian during the Permian-Triassic extinction event.

Description

They were stocky, with short tails, small heads, robust limbs, and broad feet. The cow-sized species Bunostegos, which lived 260 million years ago, is the earliest known example of a tetrapod with a fully erect posture as its legs were positioned directly under its body. Pareiasaurs were protected by bony scutes called osteoderms that were set into the skin. Their heavy skulls were ornamented with multiple knobs and ridges. The leaf-shaped multi-cusped teeth resemble those of iguanas, caseids, and other reptilian herbivores. This dentition, together with the deep body, which may have housed an extensive digestive tract, are evidence of a herbivorous diet. Most authors have assumed a terrestrial lifestyle for pareiasaurs. A 2008 bone microanatomy study suggested a more aquatic, plausibly amphibious lifestyle, but a later 2019 study found that the bone histology provided no direct evidence of this lifestyle.

Evolutionary history
Pareiasaurs appear very suddenly in the fossil record. It is clear that these animals are parareptiles. As such, they are closely related to Nycteroleterids. Pareiasaurs filled the large herbivore niche (or guild) that had been occupied early in the Permian period by the Caseid pelycosaurs and, before them, the Diadectid reptillomorphs. They are much larger than the diadectids, more similar to the giant caseid pelycosaur Cotylorhynchus. Although the last Pareiasaurs were no larger than the first types (indeed, many of the last ones became smaller), there was a definite tendency towards increased armour as the group developed. Pareiasaurs first appeared in the fossil record in the Middle Permian (Guadalupian) of Southern Pangaea, before dispersing into Northern Pangaea and gaining a cosmopolitan distribution during the Late Permian (Lopingian).

Classification
Some paleontologists considered that pareiasaurs were direct ancestors of modern turtles. Pareiasaur skulls have several turtle-like features, and in some species the scutes have developed into bony plates, possibly the precursors of a turtle shell. Jalil and Janvier, in a large analysis of pareiasaur relationships, also found turtles to be close relatives of the "dwarf" pareiasaurs, such as Pumiliopareia. However, the discovery of Pappochelys argues against a potential pareisaurian relationship to turtles, and DNA evidence indicates that living turtles are more closely related to living archosaurs than lepidosaurs, and therefore cladistically diapsids.

Associated clades
Hallucicrania (Lee 1995): This clade was coined by MSY Lee for Lanthanosuchidae + (Pareiasauridae + Testudines). Lee's pareiasaur hypothesis has become untenable due to the diapsid features of the stem turtle Pappochelys and the potential testudinatan nature of Eunotosaurus. Recent cladistic analyses reveal that lanthanosuchids have a much more basal position in the Procolophonomorpha, and that the nearest sister taxon to the pareiasaurs are the rather unexceptional and conventional looking nycteroleterids (Müller & Tsuji 2007, Lyson et al. 2010) the two being united in the clade Pareiasauromorpha (Tsuji et al. 2012).

Pareiasauroidea (Nopcsa, 1928): This clade (as opposed to the superfamily or suborder Pareiasauroidea) was used by Lee (1995) for Pareiasauridae + Sclerosaurus. More recent cladistic studies place Sclerosaurus in the procolophonid subfamily Leptopleuroninae (Cisneros 2006, Sues & Reisz 2008), which means the similarities with pareiasaurs are the result of convergences.

Pareiasauria (Seeley, 1988): If neither Lanthanosuchids or Testudines are included in the clade, the Pareiasauria only contains the monophyletic family Pareiasauridae. It's a traditional linnaean term.

Phylogeny
Below is a cladogram from Tsuji et al. (2013):

References

 Carroll, R. L., (1988), Vertebrate Paleontology and Evolution, W.H. Freeman & Co. New York, p. 205
 Kuhn, O, 1969, Cotylosauria, part 6 of Handbuch der Palaoherpetologie (Encyclopedia of Palaeoherpetology), Gustav Fischer Verlag, Stuttgart & Portland
 Laurin, M. (1996), "Introduction to Pareiasauria - An Upper Permian group of Anapsids"

External links
 Hallucicrania - Pareiasauriformes at Mikko's Phylogeny Archive
 Anapsida: Hallucicrania at Palaeos